Tryfil is a hamlet in the community of Bodffordd, Ynys Môn, Wales, which is 135.9 miles (218.7 km) from Cardiff and 218.3 miles (351.3 km) from London.

References

See also 
 List of localities in Wales by population

Villages in Anglesey